Drillia rufescens is a species of sea snail, a marine gastropod mollusk in the family Drilliidae.

Description
The length of the shell attains 8 mm, its diameter 3.5 mm.

Distribution
This species occurs in the Pacific Ocean off Samoa..

References

  Tucker, J.K. 2004 Catalog of recent and fossil turrids (Mollusca: Gastropoda). Zootaxa 682:1–1295

External links

rufescens
Gastropods described in 1871